William Arthur Dawson (3 December 1850 – ) was an English first-class cricketer, who played one match for Yorkshire County Cricket Club in 1870.  He bagged a pair in his only appearance against Kent at Dewsbury and did not bowl but did take a catch.  Despite his lack of contribution, Yorkshire ran out comfortable winners by 82 runs, thanks largely to the bowling of Tom Emmett and George Freeman. He also appeared in a Leeds Clarence side in 1872. Dawson played rugby union for both Bradford and Yorkshire (1871-3).

Born in Bradford, Yorkshire, England, Dawson died in March 1916, in Ilkley, Yorkshire.

References

External links
Cricinfo Profile

1850 births
1916 deaths
Cricketers from Bradford
English rugby union players
English cricketers
English cricketers of 1864 to 1889
Rugby union players from Bradford
Yorkshire cricketers